Bellview is an unincorporated community in Miller County, in the U.S. state of Georgia.

History
A variant name was "Bait". A post office called Bait was established in 1887, and remained in operation until 1907. In 1900, the community had 27 inhabitants.

References

Unincorporated communities in Miller County, Georgia
Unincorporated communities in Georgia (U.S. state)